The International Council of Shopping Centers, doing business as ICSC, is the global trade association of what it calls the "Marketplaces Industry" (i.e., shopping centers, shopping malls, and all other retail real estate). Founded in 1957, it features more than 70,000 members in over 100 countries, including shopping center owners, developers, managers, marketing specialists, investors, retailers and brokers, as well as academics and public officials. As the global industry trade association, ICSC links with more than 25 national and regional shopping center councils throughout the world.  

In July 2021, ICSC rebranded itself in terms of its initials alone, and adopted the tagline "Innovating Commerce Serving Communities".

Worldwide Relationships
ICSC maintains mutually beneficial relationships with national shopping center councils throughout the world.  The national and regional councils are:
 Argentine Chamber of Shopping Centers (CASC)
 Colombian Shopping Centers Association (ACECOLOMBIA)
 Asociacion de Centros Comerciales de Medellin (ASOCENTROS)
 Shopping Centre Council of Australia
 Austrian Council of Shopping Centers
 Belgian Luxembourg Council of Shopping Centers
 Brazilian Shopping Centers Association (ABRASCE)

 Chilean Chamber of Shopping Centers (CChCC)
 Dutch Council of Shopping Centers
 French Council of Shopping Centers (CNCC)
 German Council of Shopping Centers e.V.
 Hungarian Council of Shopping Centers
 Italian Council of Shopping Centers
 Japan Council of Shopping Centers
 Middle East Council of Shopping Centres
 Mall China Information Center
 New Zealand Council of Shopping Centres
 Nordic Council of Shopping Centers
 Peruvian Shopping and Entertainment Centers Association (ACCEP)
 Polish Council of Shopping Centers
 Portuguese Association of Shopping Centres
 Revo (formerly British Council of Shopping Centres or BCSC)
 Russian Council of Shopping Centres
 South African Council of Shopping Centres
 Spanish Association of Shopping Centers (AECC)
 Swiss Council of Shopping Centers (SCSC)
 Taiwan Council of Shopping Centers
 Turkish Federation of Shopping Centers & Retailers (TAMPF)
 Venezuelan Chamber of Shopping Centers (CAVECECO)

References

External links 

 

Retail trade associations
Organizations established in 1957
Shopping
Organizations based in New York City